The Pratt & Whitney F401 (company designation JTF22) was an afterburning turbofan engine developed by Pratt & Whitney in tandem with the Pratt & Whitney F100. The F401 was intended to power the Grumman F-14 Tomcat and Rockwell XFV-12, but the engine was canceled due to costs and development issues.

Design and development

In 1967, the United States Air Force and United States Navy issued a joint engine Request for Proposals (RFP) for the F-14 Tomcat and the FX, the fighter design competition that led to the F-15 Eagle in 1970. This engine program was called the Initial Engine Development Program (IEDP), and was funded and managed out of the Aeronautical Systems Division (ASD) at Wright-Patterson Air Force Base.

The IEDP was created to be a competitive engine design/demonstration phase followed with a down select to one winning engine design and development program.  General Electric and Pratt & Whitney were placed on contract for an approximately 18-month program with goals to improve thrust and reduce weight to achieve a thrust-to-weight ratio of 8. At the end of the IEDP, General Electric and Pratt & Whitney submitted proposals for their engine candidates for the aircraft that had been selected in the FX Competition, the McDonnell Douglas F-15. The engine was designated the Pratt & Whitney F100 engine. The Air Force would award Pratt & Whitney a contract in 1970 to develop and produce F100-PW-100 (USAF) and F401-PW-400 (USN) engines. The Navy would use the engine in the planned F-14B and the Rockwell XFV-12 project, but would cut back and later cancel its order with the latter's failure, and chose to continue to use the Pratt & Whitney TF30 engine from the F-111 in its F-14.

The F401 was the naval variant of the F100 design, sharing its core design while having a larger fan for greater bypass ratio, cruise efficiency and static thrust. The turbomachinery layout is largely the same as the F100, with the exception of an additional compressor stage driven by the low-pressure spool. The F401 produced  in max continuous power,  in military power, and  augmented (in afterburner). This engine was intended to replace the TF30 in the originally planned F-14B and a prototype was first flown in 1973. Due to costs and the reliability issues that dogged early F100s, the F401 was eventually cancelled in 1974; the F-14B designation would later be used for F-14s re-engined with the General Electric F110. The F401 was also used in the developmental XFV-12, as well as the proposed Convair Model 200, and the Vought Model 1600, a naval F-16 derivative.

Applications

 Convair Model 200
 Grumman F-14B Tomcat (planned; test aircraft only)
 Rockwell XFV-12
 Vought Model 1600 (proposed)

Specifications (F401-PW-400)

See also

References

Bibliography

External links

Low-bypass turbofan engines
F401
1970s turbofan engines